In molecular biology, the Avian encephalitis virus cis-acting replication element (CRE) is an s an RNA element which is found in the coding region of the RNA-dependent RNA polymerase in Avian encephalitis virus (AEV). It is structurally similar to the Hepatitis A virus cis-acting replication element.

See also
Hepatitis A virus cis-acting replication element

References

RNA
Non-coding RNA